Elections to the French National Assembly were held in French Somaliland on 21 October 1945, with a second round on 4 November as part of the wider parliamentary elections. René Bernard-Cothier was elected as the territory's MP.

Results

References

French Somaliland
1945 in French Somaliland
Elections in Djibouti
October 1945 events in Africa